Black Rage is a book by psychiatrists William H. Grier and Price M. Cobbs. Released in 1968 after the assassination of Martin Luther King Jr. and the subsequent riots in Washington, D.C., the book received significant attention immediately  and in the years since, and led to an ABC television special in 1969 entitled, To Be Black.

The book
The book led to the legal concept of black rage, notably proposed as a defense by the defense attorneys representing Colin Ferguson (Ferguson went against the advice of his legal counsel and represented himself, arguing that he was completely innocent of the charges). Its working title was, Reflections on the Negro Psyche.

The authors

The authors both were psychiatrists who, in the mid-1960s, founded a clinic in San Francisco and later, authored another book together, The Jesus Bag in 1971.

Price M. Cobbs also wrote an autobiography entitled, My American Life: From Rage to Entitlement, about his experiences following the publication of Black Rage. He died on June 25, 2018 at the age of 89. He authored several books and was a resource to many on the topics of understanding cultural stereotyping, prejudice, and race relations.

William H. Grier, who died in 2015, was the father of comedian David Alan Grier.

The New York Times review
After Kenneth B. Clark published a negative review of the book in The New York Times, the authors wrote an editorial, stating "after 62 highly favorable reviews, the 63rd and first critical comment came from a black brother."

See also
White Rage, a 2016 book about white backlash
Mark Essex, a black serial killer who was inspired by the book

External links 
 1968 Interview with William H. Grier at The WNYC Archives

References

1967 riots
1968 non-fiction books
African-American cultural history
African-American-related controversies
Basic Books books
Books about African-American history
Civil rights protests in the United States
English-language books
King assassination riots
Race and crime in the United States
Sociology books